Corbeau is a French language surname from the French word for raven. Notable people with the name include:
 André Corbeau (1950), French former professional racing cyclist
 Bert Corbeau (1894–1942), Canadian professional ice hockey defenceman
 Caspar Corbeau (2001), Dutch American swimmer
 Con Corbeau (1885–1920), Canadian professional ice hockey defenceman
 Peter Corbeau, fictional character appearing in American comic books published by Marvel Comics

References 

French-language surnames
Surnames from nicknames